Frank Galle (born 13 December 1936) is a former  Australian rules footballer who played with North Melbourne in the Victorian Football League (VFL).

Notes

External links 

Living people
1936 births
Australian rules footballers from Victoria (Australia)
North Melbourne Football Club players